John Flint Cahan (February 1, 1889 – November 8, 1928) was an engineer and political figure in Nova Scotia, Canada. He represented Yarmouth County in the Nova Scotia House of Assembly from 1925 to 1928 as a Liberal-Conservative member.

Early life and education
He was born in Halifax, the son of Charles Cahan and Mary Chisholm. He was educated at Dalhousie University and McGill University.

Career and death
He served as a member of the province's Executive Council from 1925 to 1928. Cahan served as a captain in the 1st Canadian Pioneers during World War I; he was seriously wounded during the war and later died in Halifax at the age of 39 as the result of his wounds.

Personal life
In 1912, Cahan married Beatrice Eleanor Davies.

References
 A Directory of the Members of the Legislative Assembly of Nova Scotia, 1758-1958, Public Archives of Nova Scotia (1958)

1889 births
1928 deaths
Progressive Conservative Association of Nova Scotia MLAs
McGill University alumni